Dimitrios Geladaris (born 6 November 1974) is a Greek former professional footballer and currently the assistant manager of Super League 1 club AEL.

Career
Born in Galatini, Kozani, Geladaris began playing football with Pontioi Veria.

Personal life
Since 2013, Geladaris attends the Evening High School of Drama.

References

Profile at epae.org
Guardian Football
Profile at Onsports.gr

1982 births
Living people
Greek footballers
Ethnikos Piraeus F.C. players
Xanthi F.C. players
Atromitos F.C. players
Ergotelis F.C. players
Doxa Drama F.C. players
Veria F.C. players
Chalkidona F.C. players
Association football defenders
People from Askio, Kozani
Footballers from Western Macedonia